The 1919–20 season saw Rochdale compete in The F.A. Cup for the 8th time where they reached the first round proper. The also competed in the Central League.

Statistics

					

|}

Competitions

Central League

F.A. Cup

Lancashire Junior Cup

Manchester Cup

References

Rochdale A.F.C. seasons
Rochdale